Michael James Northey (born 24 March 1987 in Auckland) is a New Zealand former racing cyclist. He competed for New Zealand at the 2014 Commonwealth Games. In April 2016 Northey announced his retirement from competition due to heart damage he suffered after contracting a virus. After his retirement he remained with his final team , initially in the role of Assistant Team Manager before being promoted to Team Manager. He left the team in 2017 in order to move back to New Zealand with his family.

Palmares
2010
1st Stage 5 Tour of Southland
2011
1st  National Criterium Championships
2012
1st Overall Tour of Southland
1st Stage 2
1st Stage 1 Tour du Loir-et-Cher
2013
1st  National Criterium Championships
2014
1st Beverley Grand Prix
2015
1st  National Criterium Championships

References

1987 births
Living people
New Zealand male cyclists
People from Auckland
Cyclists at the 2014 Commonwealth Games
Commonwealth Games competitors for New Zealand